The  is an arm of the Ministry of Foreign Affairs (Japan). The goal of the office is to help developing nations with supplies, civil engineering and other assistance. The ODA was started in 1954 after Japan signed the Colombo Plan, which pledges to provide aid to nations who need it. As of 2003, the ODA has provided over $221 billion USD to 185 nations and regions. The main institution that is managing Japanese ODA is Japan International Cooperation Agency.

History
In February 2015, the decision was made to establish the Development Cooperation Charter as a means of taking a "proactive" approach to promoting peace and stability. Its approval allows Tokyo to grant monetary aid to foreign militaries for non-military operations. The DCC prioritizes Southeast Asia in granting aid.

The wording of the DCC is a bit ambiguous because it can be used to justify the financing of non-combat equipment like radar, aircraft and ISR equipment.

Countries

China

Japan's Official Development Assistance to China began in 1979 after the Treaty of Peace and Friendship between Japan and China signed in 1978. From 1979 to 2013, Japan has provided 24 billion USD in loan aid and 7,796 million dollar in grant aid including US$6,577 million in technical cooperation, a total of US$32 billion. Even in 2013, Japan still provided US$296 million loan and US$30 million grant.

See also
 Fukuda Doctrine

References

External links 
 

Government of Japan
1954 establishments in Japan
Organizations established in 1954

ja:政府開発援助